Murad or Murat, later Pierre Mehmet Sayd was a son of Cem Sultan. Little is known about his early life. After their exile, Murad stayed in Cairo and later escaped to Rhodes, because he feared that the Mamluks would surrender him to Bayezid II, who executed his brother Oguzhan. Marino Sanuto says that on 5 December 1516, an ambassador of the Mamluk sultan came to Rhodes to demand the surrender of Murad, but the knights refused outright. Murad was given the Chateau de Fondo as his residence and showed gratitude by converting to Roman Catholicism, changing his name to Pierre. Pope Alexander VI created the Principate de Sayd in 1492 as a papal fief for him. Later, he married an Italian woman named Maria Concetta Doria, who had seven children from him, four sons and three daughters, whose names are unknown. Little Cem was baptized and took the name Niccolo. When Suleiman the Magnificent conquered Rhodes in 1522, he insisted that Murad to be handed over him, whereupon he had the prince executed.

References

1522 deaths
16th-century people from the Ottoman Empire
Executed people from the Ottoman Empire
Year of birth unknown
16th-century executions by the Ottoman Empire
People executed by ligature strangulation
Executed royalty
Converts to Roman Catholicism from Islam